Karen Joubert Cordier (born 29 August 1954) is a French-American artist born in Neuilly-sur-Seine, France.

Early life 
Joubert Cordier's father was a Compagnie Générale Transatlantique navy captain and her mother was a model. Joubert Cordier had opportunities to explore the world and meet many legendary people, including Coco Chanel, Charlie Chaplin, and Leopold, King of Belgium.

Career 
Upon completion of her studies at the Academy Charpentier in Paris, she was counseled by a famous art dealer, Daniel Cordier. Her first show was at the Gallery Beaubourg in Paris, and was followed by a permanent exhibition at the Georges Pompidou Museum.

She has received praise from art critic Bernard Lamarche-Vadel, Jean-Pierre Thébault, Consul General of France in Hong Kong and Macao, and Henrietta Tsui, the Director of Galerie Ora-Ora.

Joubert Cordier has embraced the surrealist and disturbing side of Dalí, the colours of Le Douanier Rousseau, the technique of Arcimboldo and the modernity of Robert Combas.

Style 
Her art draws on such movements as expressionism, fauvism, pointillism, postmodernism, and surrealism. She deals with themes of travel, nature, and plant life. 

Joubert Cordier tends to use the entirety of her canvases, filling them with detail.

Collections

Le Dechainement de Vegetal (translation: the unbridled vegetation) is an accumulation of details of flowers and plants exploded by the use of fluorescent colours and freedom of composition.

Her L'Exotism series features canvases full of plants and animals.

La Narrative Figurative
More recently, Joubert Cordier's paintings are inspired by her travels. Being the daughter of the Chief Purser of the liner France, she is widely traveled and has crossed the Atlantic Ocean 49 times. Each of her journeys is a "true source of inspiration". Her work starts on a point where she sketches cartoonlike images of days that pass by. She completes these in her workshop where her brushes will interpret all the knowledge she had assimilated throughout her travelling, transporting the eye into different worlds. The collection could be subdivided into two genres:

French Prestige
This series draws on Joubert Cordier's travels as a child. These encounters marked a unique impression on her and have reinforced a unique vision in her illustrative work. Joubert Cordier translated her experiences with collage of memories, from glamorous Europe to the wave of Pop art and icons of the time.

Romantic Rivera
This title greets the arrival of English and American residents in search of a quiet place at the beginning of the last century. It is the Golden age of "Cote d'Azure" that Joubert Cordier feels. She expresses this feeling in colours of the quiet blue of the sea, the intense and warm red of the sun and especially by Sienna dust which stresses the romantic, nostalgic and sometimes disturbing atmosphere of these subjects in black and white. In these peculiar settings, she introduces people who are the stars in business, movies, arts and novels.

"We often stayed at the Negresco Hotel in Nice, the Carlton Hotel in Cannes, The Grand Hotel in St. Jean Cap Ferrat, in the most famous hotels around the world. I often encountered Salvador Dalí, dined with Hitchcock... danced with Sutherland and so many others. A delightful, enriching gift of experiences through my parents, a step in wealth and luxury which had to be transmitted one day through art." - Karen Joubert Cordier

Pop

Joubert Cordier's Pop collection is a reminiscence of the comic strips of the childhood days, the American dream, and the chewing gum societies. From economic intelligence to Andy Warhol's Marilyn, from Mickey Mouse to Superman, from Norman Rockwell to Bill Gates, her world is colourful in pure pop art tradition.

Collectors
Joubert Cordier's works are collected by the Georges Pompidou Museum in Paris, which houses the largest collection of modern art in Europe. Her works are also collected by many others, including former French Prime Minister Jean-Francois Girard, entertainer Elton John and the Rockefeller Foundation. 

Many of her paintings are now collected and showcased in national museums, including the Art Modern Museum in Toulouse, and are in the hands of international collectors.

Exhibitions
2010
Shanghai "My City Our Dreams" Gala Auction, Shanghai, China; 5 May
Lifeline Express "The Beauty of Nature" Charity Painting Exhibition, Pacific Place, Hong Kong; 16 - 19 Apr
Christine Gallery, Seoul, South Korea

2009
Alife Fresco 7th Anniversary, Tokyo; 28 August

Festival de Cannes; 20 May
Le French May, Hong Kong Arts Centre, Hong Kong; 1 – 7 May

Galarie Marie Ricoo, Calvi; 11 – 30 April
Les désordres du plaisir, Musée des abattoirs, Art Moden Museum, Toulouse (new donation Daniel Cordier); 24 Jan – 19 April

2008
Hong Kong International Arts and Antiques Fair, Hong Kong
Fresco on wall: CERAM Business School, Sophia Antipolis
Museum of Perfume, Grasse
Gallery Take 121, Nashville, USA
Happy Art Gallery and Rotshield Bank, Cannes; 8 Oct
Galerie Geraldine Zberro, Paris
Galerie Onega, Paris
Chicago Sister cities international, Chicago, USA; 8 Oct

2007
Galerie Pelissier, Nice
Grand Hotel St. Jean cap, Ferrat
Galerie de l’eveche, Vence

2006
Raffles Museum, Singapore
Ode to Art Gallery, Singapore
Negresco Hotel, Nice
Kieba Gallery, Vence
Karement Karen College Nikide, St Phalle

2005
Dream and Passion, Singapore
French Affair with Singapore, Singapore
Villa Durazzo, Santa Margarita, Italy
Les Abattoirs, Art Modern Museum, Toulouse
Beaubourg Gallery, Vence
Negresco Hotel, Nice
Château Ste Roseline, Draguignan
Cultural Center, Roquefort les pins

2004
Business Center, Nice Airport
Galerie Loumani, Valbonne

2003
La Verand’anne, Gstaad, Switzerland
Referencing at Georges Pompidou Library
Fifth Gallery, Paris
Galerie de l’eveche, Vence
SNCP Champs Elysees, Paris

2002
Cultural Center, Roquefort les pins
L’Abbaye, La Colle sur Loup
Mas d’Artigny, Vence

2001
Gallery Aurora (William), Shanghai, China
Navy Museum, Le Havre
Mas d’Artigny, Vence
Negresco Hotel, Nice
Tatina Tournemine Gallery, Paris
Beaubourg Gallery, Vence

2000
Chateau des fleurs, Marianne and Pierre Nahon, Vence
L’Ile en terre Gallery, Vence

1991 - 1999
99: L’Abbaye, La Colle sur Loup
98: Chateau Str Roseline, Draguignan
98: Consulat du Canada, Chicago, USA
96: New Eastside Art Works, Chicago, USA
96: Nicole Gallery, Chicago, USA
94: Majestic Hotel, Cannes

1980 - 1990
89: Art Honction Nahon, Nice
88: Centre Georges Pompidou, Paris
87: Galerie Beaubourg, Paris
86: Henry Clew Foundation, Mandelieu

Permanent exhibitions
Les Abattoirs, Art Modern Museum, Toulouse
Georges Pompidou Centre, Paris
Galerie Onega, Paris
Navy Museum, Le Havre
Galerie Marie Ricco, Calvi
Happy Art Galerie, Cannes
Ode de Art Gallery, Singapore

Products
Karen x Feria Design Closet has produced a line of products, including perfume (in collaboration with Givenchy), handbags, porches, keychains and T-shirts.

References

20th-century French painters
21st-century French painters
People from Neuilly-sur-Seine
Living people
1954 births
20th-century French women artists
21st-century French women artists
French women painters